The 1995 African Judo Championships were the 2nd edition of the African Judo Championships, organised by the African Judo Union and were held in Harare, Zimbabwe 1995.

References

External links
 

1995
African Championships
Sports competitions in Zimbabwe